C. E. Falk III (born November 5, 1987) is an American professional stock car racing driver. Son of former NASCAR competitor Eddie Falk and nephew of current team owner Joe Falk, he currently competes regularly at the famed Langley Speedway. He married Kaliegh Rey Shidler on New Year's Eve in 2014.

Career

Short tracks
A native of Virginia's Hampton Roads region and a graduate of the University of North Carolina at Charlotte, Falk began his professional racing career in 2006 in the Hooters Pro Cup Series; he ran six races with a best finish of eleventh at Montgomery Motor Speedway. Moving full-time to short track competition at Langley Speedway in Virginia, Falk soon established himself at the track, becoming regarded as one of the best drivers ever to compete at the well-known facility. After a winless 2008, he won more than half the track's races on his way to the 2009 series championship.

Falk won the 2010 Denny Hamlin Short Track Showdown charity race at Southside Speedway, defeating an all-star field including Sprint Cup Series drivers Denny Hamlin, Tony Stewart, Kyle Busch and Bobby Labonte; Falk passed Hamlin on the final lap for the win, holding off a charging Stewart to take what Falk described it as the biggest win of his career. The win boosted Falk's stock among NASCAR team owners; later that year he would win his second Langley track championship, while in 2011 he would capture a third consecutive title.

Falk also competes at other Southeastern short tracks, being a regular at South Boston Speedway; in 2012 he broadened his racing to a variety of tracks in pursuit of the NASCAR Whelen All-American Series national short-track championship.

National touring series

Falk made his debut in NASCAR's national touring series in 2010, competing in the Camping World Truck Series for two events. Driving for Rick Ware Racing, he made his debut at Martinsville Speedway; starting 30th, he finished 25th. In his second race in the series at Phoenix International Raceway, Falk started 26th and finished 28th.

In 2012, in addition to seeking a fourth consecutive Langley Speedway championship, an effort derailed by a pair of disqualifications over the course of the season, Falk sought to break into more regular NASCAR touring competition; when his uncle purchased the former Richard Childress Racing No. 33 Sprint Cup Series team, he stated that Falk would likely be among the drivers to compete in the car at some point during the 2012 season. In May, Falk was voted the top driver among NASCAR regional and touring series competitors; in late June, Falk joined Hillman Racing to drive the team's No. 27 truck at Kentucky Speedway in the Camping World Truck Series. Falk crashed his truck in practice for the event; borrowing a backup truck, he started and parked in the race, finishing 34th. Falk later ran races for the team at Chicagoland Speedway and Pocono Raceway, finishing 16th at the latter track.

In 2013, Falk competed in the inaugural UNOH Battle at the Beach at Daytona International Speedway, racing in the Whelen All-American Series portion of the event. Falk led 61 laps of the race before being wrecked by Kyle Larson for the win; he recovered to finish third, his performance attracting interest from teams in NASCAR's upper-level series.

Motorsports career results

NASCAR
(key) (Bold – Pole position awarded by qualifying time. Italics – Pole position earned by points standings or practice time. * – Most laps led.)

Camping World Truck Series

* Season still in progress
1 Ineligible for series points

References

External links
 
 
 C. E. Falk at Langley Speedway

Living people
1987 births
Sportspeople from Norfolk, Virginia
Racing drivers from Virginia
NASCAR drivers
CARS Tour drivers
University of North Carolina at Charlotte alumni